Bani Naameh or Baninaameh may refer to:
 Bani Naameh-ye Jonubi
 Bani Naameh-ye Shomali